Township 4 is a township in Rooks County, Kansas, United States.

History
Rooks County was established with four townships: Bow Creek, Lowell, Paradise and Stockton. That number increased to seven by 1878 and twenty three in 1925. The twenty three townships were in place until 1971 when the number was reduced to the current twelve townships.

Township 4 was formed by renaming Hobart Township in 1971. While other Rooks County townships were combined pursuant to Kansas Statute 80-1110, Hobart was just renamed using the new naming standard.

Box Elder Creek flows through Township 4 where it feeds Rooks State Fishing Lake (aka Lake Stockton).

Hobart Township
Hobart Township was established in 1879 from part of the original Stockton Township. Hobart was named for Hobart, IN.

Transportation
Rooks County Regional Airport is located in Township 4.

References

Townships in Rooks County, Kansas
Townships in Kansas